Józef Beck (4 October 1894 – 5 June 1944) was a Polish statesman who served the Second Republic of Poland as a diplomat and military officer. A close associate of Józef Piłsudski, Beck is most famous for being Polish foreign minister in the 1930s and for largely setting Polish foreign policy.

He tried to fulfill Piłsudski's dream of making Poland the leader of a regional coalition, but he was widely disliked and distrusted by other governments. He was involved in territorial disputes with Lithuania and Czechoslovakia. With his nation caught between two large hostile powers (Germany and the Soviet Union), Beck sometimes pursued accommodation with them and sometimes defied them. He attempted to take advantage of their mutual antagonism but then formed an alliance with the United Kingdom and France. Both declared war on Germany after its invasion of Poland in 1939. After the Soviet Union also invaded Poland, Beck and the rest of his government evacuated to Romania.

Early life

Beck was born into a Calvinist (Protestant) family whose forbears had emigrated from Flanders to Poland in the 16th century, during the rule of Polish King Stephen Báthory. When World War I started, Beck was a student at a college of engineering. After the outbreak of the war, Beck was a member of the clandestine Polish Military Organization (Polska Organizacja Wojskowa, or POW), founded in October 1914 by Piłsudski. Joining in 1914 Beck served until 1917 in the First Brigade of the Polish Legions and was an aide to Piłsudski. When the Brigade was interned, Beck escaped.

After Poland had its regained independence, Beck was assigned as a commander of an artillery battery and assigned to the General Staff. Beck served as military attaché to France between 1922 and 1923. The French disliked Beck to the point of spreading lies about him, such that he was a Soviet agent. He helped to carry out the May 1926 military coup d'état, which brought Piłsudski to de facto governmental power.

In 1926–1930, Beck served as chief of staff to Poland's Minister of Military Affairs, and in 1930–1932, he served as Vice Prime Minister and Vice Minister of Foreign Affairs. Groomed by Piłsudski to implement Poland's foreign policy, he in 1932 took office as Minister of Foreign Affairs, a post that he would hold until the outbreak of World War II.

Foreign minister
Beck had a weak hand. The historian David G. Williamson argues that Poland with 35 million people had a large population but a thin industrial base. Furthermore, its army of 283,000 men was ill-equipped, short of artillery and poorly trained and relied heavily on cavalry because it lacked enough mechanisation. Finally it faced long borders with two powerful dictatorships, Hitler's Germany and Stalin's Soviet Union. Historian Richard Overy wrote that of all the new states in Europe:

In his international diplomacy, Beck sought to maintain a fine balance in Poland's relations with its two powerful neighbours. In July 1932, he concluded the Soviet–Polish Non-Aggression Pact and, in January 1934, the German–Polish declaration of non-aggression. 

Beck complained that while Poland and Czechoslovakia were legally bound by treaty to respect the rights of their respective German minorities, the Polish minorities in Germany and the Soviet Union were not so protected. In addition, Beck resented that countries, such as Germany, used the Minorities Treaty to exert pressure and become involved in the internal affairs of Poland. In September 1934, Beck renounced the Minorities Treaty after the Soviet Union had been admitted to the League of Nations.

After Piłsudski's death in May 1935, a power-sharing agreement was entered into by the various Piłsudskiite factions, led by General (later Marshal) Edward Rydz-Śmigły, President Ignacy Mościcki and Beck himself. The three individuals effectively dominated the Sanacja (Sanation) and collectively ruled Poland until the outbreak of the Second World War. Beck had a more-or-less free hand in formulating Poland's foreign policy. The stability of the ruling group was weakened because of personal conflicts, and none of the three men managed to assert his dominance in the late 1930s completely. The oligarchy from 1935 to 1939 is often described by historians as a "dictatorship without a dictator".

Strategic ideas

Beck was hostile to the League of Nations and did not think it could help Poland. France wanted some arrangement with Poland but distrusted Beck and so he looked in new directions. He explored the possibility of realising Piłsudski's concept of Międzymorze ("Between-seas"), a federation of central and eastern European countries stretching from the Baltic Sea to the Black Sea, indeed in later variants from the Arctic Ocean to the Mediterranean. Such a coalition between Germany in the west and the Soviet Union in the east might have been strong enough to deter both from military intervention. Beck realised that for the immediate future there was no realistic chance of building such a force and so he was prepared to settle in 1937–1938 for a diplomatic bloc referred to as a "Third Europe", led by Poland, which might become the nucleus of a Międzymorze federation. Beck's "Third Europe" diplomatic concept comprised a bloc made up of Poland, Italy, Yugoslavia, Hungary and Romania.

His efforts failed for several reasons:
Both Italy and Hungary preferred to align themselves with Germany, rather than Poland.
The dispute between Romania and Hungary over Transylvania doomed efforts to include them in a common bloc.
The desire of both Italy and Hungary to partition Yugoslavia blocked any effort to include Rome, Budapest and Belgrade in an alliance.
None of the other four states that was meant to form the "Third Europe" with Poland was interested in accepting Polish leadership.

From 1935 to 1939, Beck supported German claims against Czechoslovakia by citing purported mistreatment of Polish minorities in Czechoslovakia. In January 1938, he demanded publicly that the Poles living in Czechoslovakia be granted the rights enjoyed by the Germans. In 1937, Beck had also begun a diplomatic offensive in favour of Slovak independence. He supported Hitler's position in the Munich agreement in 1938. Within days, Poland invaded and seized Teschen, an industrial district of Czechoslovakia with 240,000 people, most of whom were ethnic Poles.

1939: German invasion 
In 1937, Hitler continued to assure Beck that Germany had no claims on Danzig, but at the start of 1939, Hitler changed his earlier position and now laid claim to Danzig, adding that military force would not be used.

Beck played a decisive role in early 1939 by staunchly refusing Hitler's demands to subordinate Poland and to turn it into a German puppet state. Hitler demanded for Poland to give away strategic territories to Germany and to join the Anti-Comintern Pact, which was directed against the Soviet Union. Beck rejected Hitler's demands for annexation of Polish Pomorze (Pomerania), which would have cut off Polish access to the sea and its main trade route, effectively making the Polish economy dependent on Germany. He also rejected demands for an extraterritorial rail and highway corridor that was to run to East Prussia and the Free City of Danzig, in exchange for vague promises regarding trade and annexation of territories inhabited by Ukrainians and Belorussians in the Soviet Union after a future war. While Hitler had been planning to annex Polish territory for several years, he finally decided to go ahead with his plans for war by early September 1939. 

Beck was surprised when Britain, looking for a pretext to confront Germany, announced at the end of March 1939 that it would defend Poland from German attack. France also offered its support, but both countries knew there was very little they could do if Germany invaded Poland.

In April 1939, Beck was in London to negotiate the terms of the British-Polish aid treaty. Beck famously voiced his refusal of German demands in a speech on 5 May 1939:

Similarly, Beck refused a request from the Soviets to allow Soviet forces to enter the country, which was made during talks in which the Polish side did not take part. A third proposal soon followed, once again elaborated by Britain, which promised support to the Polish government if the country's borders were endangered. This time around, Beck accepted it. According to Joseph E. Davies, the Polish government underestimated German military power.

As a result, Hitler's diplomatic efforts shifted to the Soviet Union and secured the German-Soviet alliance in August 1939. Known as the Molotov–Ribbentrop Pact, it secured Soviet support in a war, a heavy flow of Soviet food and oil and an agreement to partition Poland and the Baltic states. By now, many observers realised that war between Germany and Poland had become imminent.

World War II

Following the invasion of Poland by Germany on 1 September 1939, the start of World War II, Beck called on Poland's allies, France and Britain, to enter the war to support Poland. In spite of the agreement between them, France and Britain did little to help Poland directly though both declared war two days after the German invasion.

After the Soviet Union attacked Poland from the east on 17 September 1939, Beck withdrew to Romania, together with the rest of the Polish government. In Romania, he was interned by the authorities at a hotel in Brașov. It was there that he wrote a volume of memoirs, Ostatni raport (Final Report).

Melchior Wańkowicz, a popular Polish journalist, met Beck in the autumn of 1939 during his internment in Romania. This is how he described the meeting:

Beck died in Singureni, Romania, on 5 June 1944, after developing tuberculosis. Beck was survived by his son Andrzej Beck, who was active in the Polish community in the United States until his death in 2011.

In May 1991, Beck's remains were repatriated to Poland and interred at Warsaw's Powązki Military Cemetery.

Honors
French Legion of Honour in the grade of Chevalier (1923) and in the grade of Officier (1927)
Order of Saint Sava I degree

Notes

Sources
 
 
Cienciala, Anna. "The Munich Crisis of 1938: Plans and Strategy in Warsaw in the Context of Western Appeasement of Germany" in The Munich crisis, 1938: Prelude to World War II, edited by Igor Lukes and Erik Goldstein, London, Frank Cass, Inc., 1999. pp. 48–81
 Cienciala, Anna M. Poland the Western Powers, 1938-1939. A Study in the Interdependence of Eastern and Western Europe (U. Toronto Press, 1968) online
Greenwood, Sean. "The Phantom Crisis: Danzig, 1939," in The Origins of the Second World War Reconsidered: A.J.P. Taylor and the Historians, edited by Gordon Martel, London, Routledge, 1999. pp. 247–72 
Gromada, Thaddeus V. "Joseph Beck in the Light of Recent Polish Historiography," Polish Review (1981) 26#3 pp 65–73

External links
 

1894 births
1944 deaths
Politicians from Warsaw
People from Warsaw Governorate
Polish Calvinist and Reformed Christians
Polish people of German descent
Nonpartisan Bloc for Cooperation with the Government politicians
Camp of National Unity politicians
Deputy Prime Ministers of Poland
Ministers of Foreign Affairs of the Second Polish Republic
Senators of the Second Polish Republic (1935–1938)
Senators of the Second Polish Republic (1938–1939)
Polish Army officers
Polish legionnaires (World War I)
People of the Polish May Coup (pro-Piłsudski side)
Lviv Polytechnic alumni
Recipients of the Cross of Independence with Swords
Recipients of the Order of the National Coat of Arms, 1st Class
Recipients of the Order of St. Sava
Burials at Powązki Military Cemetery
Polish military attachés
Recipients of the Order of the White Eagle (Poland)
20th-century deaths from tuberculosis
Tuberculosis deaths in Romania